Oklahoma's 6th congressional district is a former U.S. congressional district in Western Oklahoma. Oklahoma gained three seats in the 1910 census, but elected the extra seats at-large in 1912. The 6th district was thus created and first used for the 1914 House election (as well as the 7th and 8th districts). Oklahoma has gradually lost seats since the 1910 census; it lost its sixth seat in the 2000 census. Since 2003, most of the territory that was in the final configuration of the 6th district has been in the 3rd district.

List of representatives

Electoral history

References

 Congressional Biographical Directory of the United States 1774–present

06
Former congressional districts of the United States
Constituencies established in 1915
1915 establishments in Oklahoma
Constituencies disestablished in 2003
2003 disestablishments in Oklahoma